Choi Young-Hoon (born March 18, 1981) is a retired South Korean football player.

References

1981 births
Living people
South Korean footballers
Jeonbuk Hyundai Motors players
Incheon United FC players
K League 1 players
Association football forwards